Jared Lee (born May 13, 1989), better known by his stage name Duckwrth (pronounced "duckworth" and stylized in all caps), is an American rapper, singer, songwriter, and artist.

Early life 
Jared Lee was born in South Central Los Angeles on May 13, 1989. He grew up in a Christian household, always surrounded by music. Before going into music, Duckwrth studied graphic design in college. He appeared in several TeamBackpack cyphers on the YouTube channel World Emcee.

Career
In the mid-2010s, Duckwrth began releasing his own songs online under the Duckwrth moniker and expanded his audience when he collaborated and released a split project with The Kickdrums in 2015 titled Nowhere. In 2016, Duckwrth released his first full-length album, I'm Uugly. In late 2017, he released a mixtape, An XTRA UUGLY Mixtape, being his first record with Republic Records. His single "Start a Riot" was featured in the 2018 film Spider-Man: Into the Spider-Verse. His song "MICHUUL." was featured in the HBO series Insecure and the CW series All American. In 2019, he released the EP The Falling Man and released his major label debut album on Republic, SuperGood, in 2020.

Discography

Studio albums

Mixtapes

EPs

Singles

As lead artist

As featured artist

Other appearances
Start A Riot, with Shaboozey, on the Spider-Man: Into the Spider-Verse soundtrack, 2018.
Unstatus Quo, done for a 2019 promotional video for Palms Casino Resort, also released as a single. 
Giants (in collaboration with Riot Games, as part of the group True Damage, featuring Duckwrth, Keke Palmer, Soyeon of (G)I-dle, Becky G, and Thutmose, 2019)
Read Your Mind, Tayla Parx featuring Duckwrth on We Need to Talk, 2019. 
Get Together, Louis the Child featuring Duckwrth on Here for Now, 2020.
Settle the Score, with Cordae on the Space Jam: A New Legacy soundtrack, 2021.

References

1988 births
Living people
21st-century American rappers
American hip hop musicians
American hip hop singers
American rhythm and blues musicians
American male singers
Rappers from Los Angeles
Singers from Los Angeles